Khukhundoo (old name is Kakandi Nagari), is a small town in the state of Uttar Pradesh in northern India, approximately  east of Deoria city near the border with Bihar state on Deoria Salempur road in Deoria district.

Kakandi Jain Circuit 
Kalyanak Kshetra - Kakandi (present name village - Khukhundoo) here became the austerity and knowledge of Tirthankara Pushpadant . Khukhundoo also well known as Tirthankara Pushpadanta birthplace as a son of King Sugriva and Queen Rama at Kakandi (Khukhundoo)  situated on the Jain Circuit.  There was a group of temples here. All turned into ruins with only one temple left. 

A Jain Temple was built here by Rai Bahadur Mulchand in 1874. The main vedi housed idols of Neminath, Pushpadanta and Parshvanath.

Kahaum pillar of Skandagupta

In 5th century an  pillar known as Kahaum pillar was erected during the reign of Skandagupta. This pillar has carvings of Parshvanatha and other tirthankars with Jain Brahmi script.

Notable things 

There is ancient temple of god Shiva at Khukhundoo. Khukhundoo is a Block (sub-division) in Deoria district of Uttar Pradesh.

There are two intermediate schools, one post graduate college and one primary health center in the town. Railway broad gauge trains of Indian Railways are running between Deoria and Bhatni passes through Nunkhar is 6 kilometer far from Khukhundoo.Former Union Cabinet Minister of India Sri Vishwanath Rai started his political career from Khukhundoo. From ancient time Khukhundoo is a center of study.

References

Cities and towns in Deoria district
Jain pilgrimage sites